Kheri Khatib Ameir (born 10 February 1950) is a Tanzanian CCM politician and Member of Parliament for Matemwe constituency since 2000.

References

1950 births
Living people
Chama Cha Mapinduzi MPs
Tanzanian MPs 2010–2015